UBB or Ubb may refer to:

Education
 Babeș-Bolyai University in Cluj-Napoca, Romania
 University of Bangka Belitung in Pangkalpinang, Indonesia
 University of Bío Bío in Chile

Media
 Ultimate Big Brother, British reality television show
 Ultimate Breaks and Beats, a series of compilation albums
 Usage Based Billing (UBB), a Canadian Radio-television and Telecommunications Commission regulation allowing Internet service providers to charge customers per gigabyte transferred

Science and technology
 UBB.classic, Social Strata's now-discontinued Perl-based internet forum
 BBCode text documents formatting ( '[b]bold[/b]' etc.)
 Ubiquitin B gene
 Unbibium, symbol Ubb for '122', a theoretical chemical element

Other uses
 Union Bordeaux Bègles, a French rugby union team
 United Bulgarian Bank
 Usedomer Bäderbahn, a German regional railway serving the spa towns on the German and Polish island of Usedom
 Mabuiag Island Airport, IATA airport code "UBB"